Zagrebtower is a building in Zagreb, Croatia, located in the neighborhood of Sigečica, on the Radnička Road. It was completed in late 2006.

It is an elliptical, 22-story,  office tower with adjacent 8-story office building which includes an underground parking garage.

See also 
 List of tallest buildings in Croatia

Sources

External links 

 Official website

Buildings and structures in Zagreb
Skyscraper office buildings in Croatia
Office buildings completed in 2006
Modernist architecture in Croatia